Black Run (also known as Black's Run) is a tributary of Spruce Run in Union County, Pennsylvania, in the United States. The stream has two unnamed tributaries and is not designated as an impaired waterbody. Its watershed is mostly forested, but there is some agricultural land. A few bridges have been constructed across the stream.

Course

Black Run begins on Buffalo Mountain in West Buffalo Township. It flows southeast for several tenths of a mile, reaching the base of the mountain and entering a valley. Here, it turns east for a few miles, entering Buffalo Township and receiving two unnamed tributaries from the left. The stream eventually turns south-southeast for more than a mile before reaching its confluence with Spruce Run.

Hydrology, geography and geology

Black Run is not designated as an impaired waterbody.

Watershed
The mouth of the stream is in the United States Geological Survey quadrangle of Lewisburg. However, its source is in the quadrangle of Williamsport SE. The stream also passes through the quadrangle of Mifflinburg.

A total of 71 percent of the watershed of Black Run is on forested land. Another 22 percent is on agricultural land and 3 percent is on impervious surfaces, though this may increase to 31 percent in the future.

The watershed of Black Run makes up approximately 3 percent of the Buffalo Creek watershed.

History
Black Run was entered into the Geographic Names Information System on August 2, 1979. Its identifier in the Geographic Names Information System is 1169736. The stream is also known as Black's Run.

A tract of land near Black Run was surveyed by James Wilson in 1771. William Black settled on the stream in 1774. A wagonmaker and farmer named Phillip Stahl settled at the mouth of the stream near Mazeppa in 1793, having moved from Bucks County.

A concrete tee beam bridge carrying State Route 1002 was built over the stream in 1948.

See also
Muddy Run (Spruce Run), next tributary of Spruce run going downstream
List of rivers of Pennsylvania

References

Rivers of Union County, Pennsylvania
Tributaries of Buffalo Creek (West Branch Susquehanna River)
Rivers of Pennsylvania